Władysław Świątek (5 December 1897 – 28 January 1930) was a Polish sports shooter. He competed in two events at the 1924 Summer Olympics.

References

External links
 

1897 births
1930 deaths
Polish male sport shooters
Olympic shooters of Poland
Shooters at the 1924 Summer Olympics
People from Inowrocław
Sportspeople from Kuyavian-Pomeranian Voivodeship
20th-century Polish people